Albert Sorby Buxton (1867–1932) was an English painter from Mansfield, Nottinghamshire. He was also a local historian, the town's antiquarian.

Sorby gave a collection of watercolours to Mansfied's art gallery. They captured the town of Mansfield at the turn of the 19th century and can be seen on permanent display at the Mansfield Museum.

References
 Mansfield Museum 
 Our Mansfield and Area

Notes

1867 births
1932 deaths
English watercolourists
English antiquarians
20th-century English painters
English male painters
19th-century British male artists
20th-century English male artists